XHLZ-FM is a radio station in Torreón, Coahuila. Broadcasting on 103.5 FM, XHLZ is owned by Capital Media and operated by Grupo Región, broadcasting a Regional Mexican format under the name Región 103.5 FM.

History

The concession for XELZ-AM 710 was awarded in 1989, with the station gaining an FM counterpart in 1994. It was initially owned by Radiorama and then operated by Grupo Radio México with its La Z grupera format.

The station was sold in the late 2000s to Grupo Radio Capital, now known as Capital Media. Until 2015, Voler was the concessionaire for Capital Media's Coahuila stations.

In 2017, Capital Media notified the IFT of its surrender of the AM frequency. XHLZ-FM flipped from pop "Capital FM" to La Romántica in October 2019.

On July 29, 2020, it was revealed that David Aguillón, a former PRI political figure, would lease Capital's four Coahuila radio stations; the formation of Grupo Región was formally announced on September 14.

References

Radio stations in Coahuila
Radio stations in the Comarca Lagunera